Joan III of Burgundy (1/2 May 1308 – 10/15 August 1347), also known as Joan of France was a reigning Countess of Burgundy and Artois in 1330–1347. She was also Duchess of Burgundy by marriage to Odo IV, Duke of Burgundy.

Biography
Joan was the eldest daughter of King Philip V of France and Countess Joan II of Burgundy. She was married in 1318 to Odo IV, Duke of Burgundy, as part of a settlement between the two men regarding the French succession (Odo had previously supported the right of his niece - and Joan's cousin - Queen Joan II of Navarre, to inherit the French throne as well); Joan thus became Duchess consort of Burgundy by marriage.

In 1330, Joan became reigning Countess of Burgundy and Artois in her own right, following the death of her mother.

Her son Philip predeceased her; her titles therefore passed to her grandson, Philip I of Burgundy upon her death in 1347.

Issue
Joan and Odo had:
Philip

References

Sources

1308 births
1347 deaths
Joan III
Counts of Burgundy
Joan III
Duchesses of Burgundy
Burgundy, Countess of, Joan III
Place of birth unknown
Place of death unknown
14th-century peers of France
14th-century women rulers
14th-century French women
Daughters of kings